Kevin Tucker may refer to:

 Kevin Tucker (anarchist) (born 1980), American anarcho-primitivist writer and speaker
 Kevin Tucker (hurler) (born 1975), Irish hurler
 Kevin M. Tucker (1940–2012), American police commissioner